May 3 - Eastern Orthodox Church calendar - May 5

All fixed commemorations below celebrated on May 17 by Orthodox Churches on the Old Calendar.

For May 4th, Orthodox Churches on the Old Calendar commemorate the Saints listed on April 21.

Saints
 Virgin-martyr Pelagia of Tarsus in Asia Minor (287)
 Hieromartyr Albian (Olbian), Bishop of Anaea in Asia Minor, and his disciples (284-303)
 Martyrs Aphrodisius, Leontius, Anthony, Valerian, Macrobius, and 60 others, monks at Scythopolis of Palestine (beginning of the 4th century)
 Hieromartyr Silvanus of Gaza, bishop, and with him 40 martyrs (311)  (see also: October 14)
 Saint Hilary of the desert, the Wonderworker.
 Saint Nicephorus of Medikion, abbot and founder of Medikion Monastery (813)
 Saint Athanasios of Corinth, bishop (10th-11th century)

Pre-Schism Western saints
 Hieromartyr Porphyrius (250)
 Saint Curcodomus, a deacon in Rome sent to help St Peregrinus (2nd century)
 Hieromartyr Erasmus of Formiae, bishop in Campania, and 20,000 martyrs with him (303)
 Martyrs Florian and 40 companions, at Lorsch, Austria (304)
 Saint Monica of Tagaste, the mother of St. Augustine of Hippo (387)
 Saint Nepotianus, nephew of St Heliodorus, Bishop of Altino near Venice in Italy (395)
 Saint Venerius of Milan, second bishop of Milan, a loyal supporter of St John Chrysostom (409)
 Saint Conleth, first Bishop of Kildare (c. 519)
 Saint Anthony du Rocher, a disciple of St Benedict and companion of St Maurus in his mission to France, founder of the monastery of Saint Julian in Tours (6th century)
 Saint Æthelred (Ethelred, Ailred), king of Mercia and monk (716)
 Saint Sacerdos of Limoges, Bishop of Limoges (720)
 Saint Gotthard of Hildesheim, became Bishop of Hildesheim in 1022 and did much to spread the Faith (1038)

Post-Schism Orthodox saints
 Saint Theodosia (Fedosia), princess of Vladimir, (wife of Jaroslav Vsevolodovich; mother of St. Alexander Nevsky) (1244)
 Venerable Nicephorus (the Solitary, the Hesychast) of Mount Athos, teacher of St. Gregory Palamas (before 1300)
 The Alfanov brothers of Novgorod: 
 Saints: Nicetas, Cyril, Nicephorus, Clement, and Isaac of Novgorod; founders of the Sokolnitzki Monastery in 1389.

New martyrs and confessors
 New Hieromartyr John Vasiliev, priest, (1942)
 New Hieromartyr Nicholas Tochtuev, deacon, (1943)
 New Hieromartyr Vasily Martysz, Archpriest (1945)  (see also April 21)

Other commemorations
 Translation of the relics of the Righteous Lazarus and Saint Mary Magdalene, Equal-to-the-Apostles, to Constantinople
 Icon of the Mother of God "Staro Rus" (Staraya Russa) Old Russian (1570)

Icon gallery

References

Sources 
 Complete List of Saints. Protection of the Mother of God Church (POMOG).
 May 4/17, Orthodox Calendar (PRAVOSLAVIE.RU)
 May 17, 2011 / May 4, HOLY TRINITY RUSSIAN ORTHODOX CHURCH (A parish of the Patriarchate of Moscow)
 May 4, 2011, OCA - The Lives of the Saints.
 May 4. Latin Saints of the Orthodox Patriarchate of Rome.
 May 4, The Roman Martyrology.
Greek Sources
 Great Synaxaristes:  4 ΜΑΪΟΥ, ΜΕΓΑΣ ΣΥΝΑΞΑΡΙΣΤΗΣ.
  Συναξαριστής. 4 Μαΐου. ECCLESIA.GR. (H ΕΚΚΛΗΣΙΑ ΤΗΣ ΕΛΛΑΔΟΣ). 
Russian Sources
  17 мая (4 мая). Православная Энциклопедия под редакцией Патриарха Московского и всея Руси Кирилла (электронная версия). (Orthodox Encyclopedia - Pravenc.ru).
  4 мая (ст.ст.) 17 мая 2013 (нов. ст.). Русская Православная Церковь Отдел внешних церковных связей. (DECR).

May in the Eastern Orthodox calendar